Faultline Entertainment Group also known as Faultline Records is an Australian independent record label based in Melbourne. It was founded in 1998 by metal music producer, dw Norton, and began as a development label. As of 2007 it has taken on partners Richard De Silva and Gary Buckley to become a full-time independent record label within Australian and Overseas. Faultline Entertainment Group has opened an office in Florida and in the near future will be opening offices in the UK and Japan. Distribution for Faultline releases within Australia are handled by both Shock Records and MGM Distribution.

Faultline artist, Daysend, were signed and distributed by Metal Blade Records in the US. In 2008 the label won a National Musicoz Award for Best Metal or Hardcore Artist, for Gasma, from Australasian Performing Right Association (APRA).

Artist roster

Daysend
Five Star Prison Cell (2005–07)
Head Inc
Noir Macabre
Antonamasia
Walk the Earth
Exit Wounds
Burns Unit
Synthetic Breed
Still Life Projector
Sëbasröckets (2004–06)

Staff

dw Norton - Head of A&R, CEO
Richard De Silva - Marketing Director
Gary Buckley - General Manager

See also

 List of record labels

References

External links
 
 Official Faultline Records USA Homepage
 Faultline Records on Myspace
 Shock Distribution
 MGM Distribution

Australian independent record labels
Record labels established in 1998
Heavy metal record labels
Rock record labels